The Strömsund Bridge (Swedish: Strömsundsbron) is a cable-stayed road bridge, bringing road E45 over Ströms vattudal, in Strömsund, Jämtland, Sweden.

Differing from what is stated almost throughout, the bridge was not designed by the German civil engineer Franz Dischinger, who at the time was already deceased. Instead, the design was submitted in 1953 for an international competition by the German steel construction company Demag (which had previously cooperated intensively with Dischinger). The structure, which opened in 1956, is considered to be the world's first large cable-stayed bridge of the modern type and was built by Demag together with the Swedish concrete construction company Skanska.
The bridge is colloquially referred to as "Jämtland's Golden Gate".

References 

Bridges in Sweden
Cable-stayed bridges in Sweden